André Michel (7 November 1907 – 5 June 1989) was a French film director and screenwriter. He directed 15 films between 1947 and 1983. He is the father of novelist Natacha Michel who is also a political activist and militant. In 1962 he was a member of the jury at the 12th Berlin International Film Festival.

Selected filmography
Fight Without Hate (1948)
Three Women (1952)
 Confession Under Four Eyes (1954)
La Sorcière (1956)

References

External links

1907 births
1989 deaths
French film directors
French male screenwriters
20th-century French screenwriters
20th-century French male writers